The IRI T250A is an Italian helicopter that was designed and produced by Italian Rotors Industries of Aprilia, Lazio and introduced in 2015. Now out of production, when it was available the aircraft was supplied complete and ready-to-fly.

The company seems to have been founded about 2013 and gone out of business in June 2016, ending production.

Design and development
The T250A features a single main rotor and tail rotor, a two-seats-in side-by-side configuration enclosed cockpit with a windshield, skid landing gear and a  PBS TS 100 turboshaft engine made by PBS Velká Bíteš.

The aircraft fuselage is made from composites.

The aircraft was built to ISO 9001 and EN 9100 standards.

Specifications (T250A)

See also
List of rotorcraft

References

External links
Official website archives on Archive.org

T250A
2010s Italian sport aircraft
2010s Italian civil utility aircraft
2010s Italian helicopters